Society Five was a gay rights and social support organisation formed in Melbourne, Australia, in January 1971. Initially known as Campaign Against Moral Persecution, after the Sydney-based organisation that inspired it, the group was soon renamed Society Five.  For a decade it campaigned on behalf of Melbourne's gay community, as well as offering a telephone counselling service. By 1977 it was matched in strength by the Homosexual Law Reform Coalition. By 1981 it had disbanded, following internal conflicts.

See also

LGBT history
LGBT rights in Australia
List of LGBT rights organizations

References

External links
 Australian Lesbian and Gay Archives holds the records of Society Five, as well as extensive holdings of publications from the former Society Five Library

LGBT political advocacy groups in Australia
1971 establishments in Australia
1981 disestablishments in Australia
Organizations established in 1971
Organizations disestablished in 1981